Gavin Williams (born 25 October 1979) is a former rugby union player from New Zealand, who played in the Top 14 and for Samoa internationally.

Williams previously played for Connacht, where he played from 2005 until the end of the 2006–07 season. After leaving Connacht, he went on to make his debut for Samoa in 2007 in a match against . Williams scored a try and conversion in Samoa's opening game in the 2007 World Cup.

After leaving Connacht, he played for US Dax before signing for Clermont.

Gavin Williams has a strong family connection in rugby with his father Bryan Williams, a strong winger who played for Auckland and New Zealand, and brother Paul Williams, who has represented the Crusaders, Highlanders and Blues in Super Rugby, and who also plays for Samoa internationally.

References
scrum.com stats
Profile at rugbyworldcup.com

1979 births
New Zealand rugby union players
New Zealand sportspeople of Cook Island descent
New Zealand sportspeople of Samoan descent
Samoa international rugby union players
Connacht Rugby players
Pacific Islanders rugby union players
Rugby union centres
New Zealand expatriate rugby union players
Expatriate rugby union players in Ireland
Expatriate rugby union players in France
New Zealand expatriate sportspeople in Ireland
New Zealand expatriate sportspeople in France
Samoan expatriate rugby union players
Samoan expatriate sportspeople in Ireland
Samoan expatriate sportspeople in France
Rugby union players from Auckland
Living people
Auckland rugby union players
Southland rugby union players
Ponsonby RFC players